The Canadian Duality Flag (also called the Canadian Unity Flag) is an unofficial flag that was originally circulated to demonstrate the unity of Canada during the lead-up to the 1995 Quebec referendum, at rallies for the "no" side. The Duality Flag design was chosen to represent explicitly the Francophone and Anglophone populations on the national flag by adding blue stripes to the red sections, roughly in proportion to the number of Canadians who are primarily French-speaking. The blue was chosen as it is the main colour that is used on the flag of Quebec.

See also
 Flag of Canada
 Flag of Quebec

References

1995 in Canada
Activism flags
Flags of Canada
National symbols of Canada
Political history of Quebec
Unofficial flags